Cyana puella is a moth of the family Erebidae. It is found in the north-western Himalayas, Nepal, India (Maharashtra, Bombay, Nilgiris), Sri Lanka, Madagascar, Kenya and Eritrea.

Description of male
White, although the palpi, antennae, a border to tegulae, a band across thorax and patagia, and a spot on the metathorax are scarlet. The legs are scarlet and white. The abdomen is dorsally tinged with crimson except towards the base. Forewings with scarlet sub-basal band expanding into a streak on costa. There is an ante-medial band with a fine black line on its inner edge and strongly excurved below the costa and a sinuous and incurved postmedial band with a black line on its outer side. There is also a black spot in end of the cell, two on the disco-cellulars, and a short black or scarlet streak beyond the postmedial line below the costa. There is a terminal band running round the apex to the postmedial band. The hindwings are pale crimson.

Description of female
The forewings have one discoidal black spot and the terminal band is not running round the apex.

Biology
The larvae probably feed on lichens. Adults have been recorded in the month of May at Matheran, Maharashtra, India.

Subspecies
Cyana puella puella
Cyana puella postflavida Rothschild, 1924 (Kenya and Eritrea)

References

Cyana
Moths described in 1773
Moths of Africa
Moths of Madagascar
Moths of Asia
Taxa named by Dru Drury